Brick and mortar  refers to a physical presence of an organization or business in a building.

Brick and mortar may also refer to:

 Bricks and mortar, literally a means of building construction
 Bricks and Mortar, the 2019 American Horse of the Year
Brick and Mortar (band), New Jersey-based drum and bass duo
 "Bricks and Mortar", a track on the album In This Light and on This Evening by the band Editors
 "Bricks and Mortar", a track on the album In the City by The Jam